The Smurfs: A Christmas Carol is a 2011 American computer animated short film based on The Smurfs comic book series created by the Belgian comics artist Peyo, and is an adaptation Charles Dickens's 1843 novella A Christmas Carol. The animated short was written by Todd Berger and directed by Troy Quane, and it stars the voices of George Lopez, Jack Angel, Melissa Sturm, Fred Armisen, Gary Basaraba, Anton Yelchin and Hank Azaria. The film was produced by Sony Pictures Animation with the animation by Sony Pictures Imageworks and Duck Studios. The Smurfs: A Christmas Carol was released on DVD on December 2, 2011, attached to The Smurfs film.

When Grouchy Smurf behaves badly to everyone and refuses to celebrate Christmas, the Smurfs of Christmas Past, Present and Future teach him to appreciate Christmas or else every smurf will fall into the hands of Gargamel.

Plot

On Christmas Eve, the Smurfs get ready for their Christmas party. Hefty Smurf and Handy Smurf cut down a Christmas tree, and by Christmas evening, they all finish and start to celebrate. Grouchy Smurf refuses to join the party, expressing his hatred towards Christmas. After their Christmas party, all of the Smurfs go to bed and receive a gift from Papa Smurf - a Smurf hat handcrafted by him. Grouchy wakes up to find a present in front of his door.

He opens it and finds a Smurf hat, but not the one he had expected - a hang glider. Grouchy yells at the top of his lungs, "I hate Christmas". Subsequently, he sees everything around him turn into animation, and finds himself animated too.

Suddenly, he sees an angel appear, who seems to be Smurfette. She explains to him that she is the Smurf of Christmas Past come to teach him a lesson about appreciating Christmas. She shows him a young "Smurfling" receiving a gift, which is a Smurf hat, and how happy the Smurfling was to get it. Then the Smurf of Christmas Present, who is Brainy Smurf, appears and shows how he felt about the gift he had received. He then tells Grouchy that if he doesn't like Christmas, what will happen is Clumsy Smurf will accidentally burn the Christmas Tree and while he tries to put it out the tree will burn even more. He then tells him to be happy on Christmas.

Then the Smurf of Christmas Future, who appears as Hefty Smurf, shows Grouchy his future. Hefty tells him that if he doesn't change his ways, all of the Smurfs will wander into the forest and get captured by Gargamel and his cat Azrael.

Then everything around him goes back to its original form, and the Smurfs come and see Grouchy on the Christmas tree decorating it by putting ornaments on it. He admits that he was wrong about Christmas, Christmas isn't a time for hating, it's about having a family who loves him and cares for him, even through he's "Grouchy." Happy to see that Grouchy learned his lesson, Papa Smurf gives him his present first, which he wholeheartedly accepts and embraces Papa Smurf, who returns the embrace. He puts the star on the top of the tree and yells out to the Smurfs, "Merry Christmas everyone".

Cast
 George Lopez as Grouchy Smurf (Ebenezer Scrooge) 
 Jack Angel as Papa Smurf
 Melissa Sturm as Smurfette (Ghost of Christmas Past)
 Fred Armisen as Brainy Smurf (Ghost of Christmas Present)
 Gary Basaraba as Hefty Smurf (Ghost of Christmas Future)
 Anton Yelchin as Clumsy Smurf
 Hank Azaria as Gargamel

Production
The Smurfs: A Christmas Carol went into development in December 2010, and was completed in nine months. The short was animated by Sony Pictures Imageworks, which did the CGI, and by Duck Studios, which animated the main, hand-drawn part of the film. The CGI are the same as in the 2011 film, while the hand-drawn part follows the original designs by the Smurfs creator, Peyo, with the help of some of the artists who worked on the 1981 television series. The short's director, Troy Quane, explained that the hand-drawn sequence "...gives us that dream-like moment where he's learning things from these ghosts," and it is "...a nice nod to the Smurfs history as a hand drawn comic."

Some of the original cast from the feature film were replaced in the short. Jack Angel, who voiced various characters in the 1980s television series, replaced Jonathan Winters as Papa Smurf. Katy Perry, who was eager to reprise her role of Smurfette, was replaced by Melissa Sturm, due to scheduling conflicts with her tour.

Release
The Smurfs: A Christmas Carol was released on December 2, 2011, only in standard definition, on DVD as part of The Smurfs three-disc holiday gift set. It was released as a stand-alone DVD on September 10, 2013.

See also
Adaptations of A Christmas Carol
List of Christmas films

References

External links
 
 
 

2011 films
2010s American animated films
2010s animated short films
2010s children's comedy films
2010s fantasy comedy films
American fantasy comedy films
American Christmas films
Animated films based on comics
Animated films based on novels
2010s children's fantasy films
Films based on Belgian comics
Films based on A Christmas Carol
Films based on multiple works
Films directed by Troy Quane
The Smurfs in film
Sony Pictures Animation short films
Sony Pictures direct-to-video films
Films scored by Christopher Lennertz
Films with screenplays by Todd Berger
2010s Christmas films
2011 comedy films
2010s English-language films